The Donaghey Building is a historic commercial building at 103 East 7th Street and 703 South Main Street in Little Rock, Arkansas. It is a fourteen-story structure, built out of reinforced concrete and faced in brick. The building forms a U shape, with a central courtyard open to the south. It was built in 1925–26 to a design by New York City architect Hunter McDonnell, and was Little Rock's tallest building for three decades, housing a variety of commercial offices, and retail spaces on the ground floor. It featured the latest advances in lighting, ventilation, and fire-resistant construction.

The building was listed on the National Register of Historic Places in 2012.

See also
National Register of Historic Places listings in Little Rock, Arkansas

References

Office buildings on the National Register of Historic Places in Arkansas
Prairie School architecture
Buildings and structures in Little Rock, Arkansas
National Register of Historic Places in Little Rock, Arkansas
Office buildings completed in 1926